The surnames Beres, Béres, Berès, and Bereś may refer to:

András Béres (1924–1993), Hungarian football manager and player
Bence Béres (born 1992), Hungarian Olympic skater
Jerzy Bereś (1930-2012), Polish sculptor and performance artist
Lisa Beres, American writer
Louis René Beres (born 1945), professor of political science at Purdue University and newspaper columnist
Mike Beres (born 1973), Canadian badminton player
Pervenche Berès (born 1957), French politician and Member of the European Parliament
Pierre Berès (1913–2008), French bookseller and antiquarian book collector
Stanisław Bereś (born 1950), Polish poet, literary critic and literary historian
Tamás Ferenc Béres (born 1982), Hungarian footballer
Zoltán Béres (born 1970), Hungarian boxer

See also
Beres (mythology)
Bere (disambiguation)

Hungarian-language surnames
Polish-language surnames